Scriptoplusia is a genus of moths of the family Noctuidae.

Species
 Scriptoplusia nigriluna Walker, [1858]
 Scriptoplusia noona Ronkay, 1987
 Scriptoplusia pulchristigma Behounek & Ronkay, 1994
 Scriptoplusia rubiflabellata (Prout, 1921)

References
 Natural History Museum Lepidoptera genus database
 Scriptoplusia at funet.fi

Plusiinae